Sherene Loi is an Australian oncologist. She is the 2021 winner of the Australian Prime Ministers Prize for Science, in the category of Frank Fenner Prize for Life Scientist of the Year. Loi is Head of Translational Breast Cancer Research, within the Peter Macallum Cancer Centre. Loi's research has advanced understanding into breast cancer, developing and implementing an immune system biomarker. This biomarker will enable improved management for people with advanced cancer. This biomarker is now part of routine pathology reporting across many countries and also is included in the World Health Organisation Classification of Tumours (the WHO Blue Book on Breast Tumors).

Early life and career 
Loi has an MMBS (Hons), and a PhD, from the University of Melbourne (2008). Loi has, from  2018 to 2020, ranked in the top 1% of global researchers, according to the Web of Science, with more than 240 peer-reviewed publications.

Loi is a medical oncologist, and her career involves translational medicine, which includes translating research findings into treatments, including using genomic medicine, for people with breast cancer, both in Australia and around the world. Her research has helped develop findings supporting that immunotherapy, treatment using the immune system to fight cancer, assists with the survival and improved quality of life of patients with advanced breast cancer.

Loi is the co-chair on the International Breast Cancer Study Group Committee (Switzerland), as well as on the Scientific Advisory Committee Member of Breast Cancer trials group. Her research uses genomic medicine to translate interesting sciencific findings to improve outcomes for breast cancer patients. As at 2021, her H-index is 90 and she has over 40,000 citations in Google Scholar.

Select publications 
P Schmid, et al. (2018)  Atezolizumab and nab-paclitaxel in advanced triple-negative breast cancer.  New England Journal of Medicine: 379 (22), 2108-2121
C Sotiriou, et al. (2014)  Gene expression profiling in breast cancer: understanding the molecular basis of histologic grade to improve prognosis Journal of the National Cancer Institute: 98 (4), 262-272.
S Loi, N Sirtaine, et al. (2013)  Prognostic and predictive value of tumor-infiltrating lymphocytes in a phase III randomized adjuvant breast cancer trial in node-positive breast cancer comparing the additiotion. Journal of Clin Oncol: 31 (7), 860-867.
S Loi, S Michiels, R Salgado, N Sirtaine, V Jose, D Fumagalli (2014) Tumor infiltrating lymphocytes are prognostic in triple negative breast cancer and predictive for trastuzumab benefit in early breast cancer: results from the FinHER trial. Annals of oncology: 25 (8), 1544-1550.

Media 
Loi's work was described, by the American Assosciation for Cancer Research, as "at the forefront of research on the biological and clinical relevance of tumor infiltrating lymphocytes in breast cancer". The Association states "she is a pioneer in designing and executing clinical trials using immunotherapy agents for the treatment of breast cancer."

When winning the Prime Ministers's award, her work was described as developing a treatment, using immunotherapy, to treat the 'world's first immunotherapy' to treat patients with the most aggressive forms of breast cancer. Her findings may benefit breast cancer patients both in Australia and around the world.

Prizes and awards

References

External links 

 Peter Mac Website
 

Australian women scientists
Living people
Year of birth missing (living people)
University of Melbourne alumni
Fellows of the Australian Academy of Health and Medical Sciences
Australian women academics
Breast cancer
Australian oncologists